The Cumberland Towers are a residential apartment highrise at 311 East 8th Street in Little Rock, Arkansas.  Built in 1974, it is an eleven-story skyscraper, with a steel frame clad in stuccoed brick, housing 178 residential units.  It was designed by Wittenberg, Delony & Davidson for the city as public senior housing, it exemplifies a design principle espoused by Le Corbusier known as the "tower in a park", with a large landscaped green area surrounding the building.

The apartments were listed on the National Register of Historic Places in 2017.

See also
National Register of Historic Places listings in Little Rock, Arkansas

References

External links

Houses on the National Register of Historic Places in Arkansas
International style architecture in Arkansas
Houses completed in 1974
Houses in Little Rock, Arkansas
National Register of Historic Places in Little Rock, Arkansas